Kétro-Bassam is a town in west-central Ivory Coast. It is a sub-prefecture of Vavoua Department in Haut-Sassandra Region, Sassandra-Marahoué District.

Kétro-Bassam was a commune until March 2012, when it became one of 1126 communes nationwide that were abolished.

In 2014, the population of the sub-prefecture of Kétro-Bassam was 24,934.

Villages
The 5 villages of the sub-prefecture of Kétro-Bassam and their population in 2014 are:
 Brouafla-Kouya (3 294)
 Dediafla (6 080)
 Ketro (4 789)
 Ketro Bassam (7 938)
 Kouleyo (2 833)

Notes

Sub-prefectures of Haut-Sassandra
Former communes of Ivory Coast